Bernd Westphal (born 30 September 1960) is a German trade unionist and politician of the Social Democratic Party (SPD) who has been serving as a member of the Bundestag from the state of Lower Saxony since 2013.

Political career 
Westphal first became a member of the Bundestag in the 2013 German federal election. He is a member of the Committee for Economic Affairs and Energy and the Parliamentary Advisory Board on Sustainable Development. He has been serving as his parliamentary group's spokesperson on economic affairs and energy since 2015. 

In the negotiations to form a coalition government under the leadership of Chancellor Angela Merkel following the 2017 federal elections, Westphal was part of the working group on energy, climate protection and the environment, led by Armin Laschet, Georg Nüßlein and Barbara Hendricks.

In the negotiations to form a so-called traffic light coalition of the SPD, the Green Party and the Free Democratic Party (FDP) following the 2021 federal elections, Westphal was part of his party's delegation in the working group on economic affairs, co-chaired by Carsten Schneider, Cem Özdemir and Michael Theurer.

Other activities

Corporate boards 
 Exxon Mobil Central Europe Holding GmbH, Member of the Supervisory Board (-2013)
 CeramTec, Member of the Supervisory Board (-2013)

Non-profit organizations 
 Nuclear Waste Disposal Fund (KENFO), Member of the Board of Trustees (since 2018)
 Business Forum of the Social Democratic Party of Germany, Chairman of the Political Advisory Board (since 2018)
 German Industry Initiative for Energy Efficiency (DENEFF), Member of the Parliamentary Advisory Board
 IG BCE, Member

References

External links 

  
 Bundestag biography 

1960 births
Living people
Members of the Bundestag for Lower Saxony
Members of the Bundestag 2021–2025
Members of the Bundestag 2017–2021
Members of the Bundestag 2013–2017
Members of the Bundestag for the Social Democratic Party of Germany